Svenja Weger (born 4 September 1993) is a German competitive sailor. Her achievements include placing 11th overall in the 2017 Laser Radial World Championships. She competed in the in Laser Radial event at the 2020 Summer Olympics, held July–August 2021 in Tokyo.

References

External links
 
 
 

1993 births
Living people
German female sailors (sport)
Olympic sailors of Germany
Sportspeople from Heidelberg
Sailors at the 2020 Summer Olympics – Laser Radial